Anderson Gonçalves Pedro  (born May 17, 1980) is a Brazilian footballer.

References

1980 births
Living people
Brazilian footballers
Brazilian expatriate footballers
Association football midfielders
Expatriate footballers in Poland
Expatriate footballers in Slovakia
Expatriate footballers in Bulgaria
Pogoń Szczecin players
Zagłębie Lubin players
FC Petržalka players
FC Montana players
Ekstraklasa players
Slovak Super Liga players
Brazilian expatriate sportspeople in Slovakia
Brazilian expatriate sportspeople in Bulgaria
Brazilian expatriate sportspeople in Poland
First Professional Football League (Bulgaria) players